St. John's Cemetery is a cemetery in Halifax, Nova Scotia and forms a series of cemeteries in the Fairview area of Halifax, next to Fairview Lawn Cemetery and Baron de Hirsch Cemetery.

Opened in 1839, it is the final resting place for a few prominent Anglicans in Halifax:
 Canadian Prime Minister Sir Charles Tupper
 Father of Confederation John William Ritchie

The cemetery contains war graves of 70 Commonwealth service personnel, 62 from World War I (of whom 48 lie in the Naval Plot in Section Q) and 8 from World War II.

References

External links
 
 

Cemeteries in Halifax, Nova Scotia
Anglican cemeteries in Canada
1839 establishments in Nova Scotia